EUG may refer to:

 Egba United Government, a 19th-century political entity in British Nigeria
 Eugene–Springfield station, a train station in Eugene, Oregon, United States
 Eugene Airport, in Oregon, United States
 European Union of Geosciences, now part of the European Geosciences Union
 European Universities Games